Dominique Roquebert (Bayonne 1744-Battle of Tamatave 1811) was a French navy officer.

Trained at the École d’Hydrographie de Bayonne, Roquebert rose to the rank of captain in the French Navy. In December 1809, he led Roquebert's expedition to the Caribbean to Guadeloupe.

In 1811, Roquebert fought at the Battle of Tamatave, the last engagement of the Mauritius campaign of 1809–1811. He was killed on his flagship, Renommée, while covering the retreat of his squadron.

Honours 
A dock of Bayonne was named Quai du Commandant Roquebert in his honour.

Sources and references 

French Navy officers
1744 births
1811 deaths
French naval commanders of the Napoleonic Wars
French military personnel killed in the Napoleonic Wars
1800s in Guadeloupe
1810s in Mauritius
18th-century French military personnel
19th-century French military personnel